Graikos is a village in the municipal unit of Falaisia, Arcadia, Greece. It is situated on a hillside, 2 km northwest of Skortsinos, 3 km south of Anavryto, 3 km southeast of Voutsaras, and 13 km southeast of Megalopoli. In 2011 Graikos had a population of 23. Graikos suffered damage from the 2007 Greek forest fires.

Population

See also
List of settlements in Arcadia

References

External links
History and information about Graikos
 Graikos on the GTP Travel Pages

Falaisia
Populated places in Arcadia, Peloponnese